Tatsiana Mazurkevich (Łacinka: Tacciana Michajłaŭna Mazurkievič Jelizarava; born September 7, 1983) is a Belarusian modern pentathlete. She competed at the 2004 Summer Olympics in Athens, Greece, where she finished ninth in the women's event, with a score of 5,220 points. Outside her Olympic career, Mazurkevich is also a multiple medalist at the World Modern Pentathlon Championships, winning four medals in overall.

References

External links
  (archived page from Pentathlon.org)

1983 births
Living people
Belarusian female modern pentathletes
Olympic modern pentathletes of Belarus
Modern pentathletes at the 2004 Summer Olympics
World Modern Pentathlon Championships medalists
21st-century Belarusian women